Cross Houses is a village in Shropshire, England, the largest village in the Parish of Berrington. It is located on the A458 road and is 4 miles south east of Shrewsbury. 

Cross Houses is also the name of a hamlet SW of Bridgnorth.

Transport
It was once served by Berrington railway station, which despite the name was much closer to Cross Houses than to its namesake.

Local businesses
The village has a Shop/Post Office/Petrol Station and also a pub "The Bell". The village also used to be home to a second pub "The Fox" which has since been converted into a single dwelling and a second house built in the former car park.

Developments
In recent years Cross Houses benefited from a new small housing development called The Chestnuts which provided 2, 3, 4 and 5 bedroom homes. The development was located on the site of the old workhouse and incorporated renovating some of the old buildings.

During 2016 work started on a new development located on the land opposite the village shop, this development will also feature a selection of 3 and 4 bedroom properties. As part of this development a new roundabout will be built assisting traffic flow through the village.

Notable people
Cross Houses was the birthplace of Kevin Whitrick, the first Briton to commit suicide online.

Atcham Union Workhouse/Cross Houses Hospital 
Cross Houses has long been renowned  for the hospital site, which has recently been redeveloped for housing.
 
The hospital was originally built as the Atcham Union Workhouse in 1793 following Atcham's incorporation under a local Act in 1792. The Incorporation was allowed under the Act to build and operate workhouses. The original building was designed by local architect John Hiram Haycock (1759–1830), and was later extended in 1851, 1871 and 1903 to increase capacity.

The part of the building that was the original Workhouse, now residential accommodation, is called Haycock House after the original architect.

In 1916, during World War I, the building became Berrington War Hospital before becoming successively a general hospital, maternity hospital and geriatric hospital after that war. The building was eventually used as NHS Trust admin offices and storage. The offices were closed in 2000 and redeveloped into modern housing.

The development, commencing in 2001, aimed to preserve the heritage of the original buildings in the workhouse complex. The original workhouse building, the kitchen/laundry block and the chapel remained where other extensions were taken down.

The chapel now houses a community centre and the former laundry and kitchen block houses offices.
 
Architecturally, the appeal of the building is with the original Workhouse and the original laundry/kitchen block which has some of the earliest cast-iron windows in the world. It is also note-worthy that "great" bricks were used in the construction of the Workhouse, reflecting the response of brick manufacturers to the brick tax.

To the north of Cross Houses lies Work House Wood – a wood strategically positioned to protect the residents of Attingham Park Mansion from views of the Workhouse.

Art in Cross Houses 
The history of the buildings inspired a group of artists during its redevelopment and Benchart in Cross Houses was formed. The artists developed contemporary public artworks in rural areas, recycling reclaimed materials from the site. Some of the art works include sculpted benches around the Workhouse and chapel and bus shelters built using reclaimed materials and reflecting the 'local vernacular'.

See also
Listed buildings in Berrington, Shropshire

Notes and references

External links

Website for Cross Houses

Villages in Shropshire